The Gift is an album by John Zorn released in 2001 on the Tzadik label as the third volume of his Music Romance Series and described as an album "for lovers only".

Reception

The AllMusic review by Sean Westergaard awarded the album 4 stars stating "Despite the undeniable beauty of the music, underneath the pretty pink wrapping and bows of the outer slipcase, Zorn has included several paintings of young girls in the cover art that some people might find slightly disturbing, as if to underscore the idea that beauty itself is highly subjective."

The authors of The Penguin Guide to Jazz Recordings called the album "Zorn's nod to mood-music barons such as Martin Denny" and wrote: "Douglas has most likely never sounded more lyrical than he does on 'Mao's Moon'."

Writing for One Final Note, Matt Bowden commented: "Zorn's melodic arrangements are the real stars here. Far from the freneticism he's famous for, Zorn opts instead for the languid, relying on the sepia-toned sway of Marc Ribot's guitar work through most of The Gift." He concluded: "The Gift is exactly what its title claims to be."

Track listing
All compositions by John Zorn
 "Makahaa" – 5:20
 "The Quiet Surf" – 3:14
 "Samarkan" – 6:41
 "Train to Thiensan" – 3:51
 "Snake Catcher" – 6:32
 "Mao's Moon" – 5:19
 "Cutting Stone" – 7:10
 "La Flor del Barrio" – 3:10
 "Bridge to the Beyond" – 5:33
 "Makahaa (reprise)" – 4:34

Personnel
Cyro Baptista – percussion
Joey Baron – drums
Jennifer Choi – violin
Greg Cohen – bass (6)
Dave Douglas – trumpet (6)
Trevor Dunn – bass
Mike Patton – voice (9)
Raman Ramakishna – cello
Marc Ribot – guitar
Masumi Rostad – viola
Ned Rothenberg – shakuhachi
Jamie Saft – organ, wurlitzer piano, piano, keyboards
John Zorn – piano, theremin (9)

References

John Zorn albums
Albums produced by John Zorn
2001 albums
Tzadik Records albums